Punishing Kiss is a studio album by German singer Ute Lemper, released in 2000 by Decca Records. It is the product of a collaboration between Lemper and the Divine Comedy and includes songs by the latter artist, as well as Nick Cave, Elvis Costello, Philip Glass, Tom Waits, Scott Walker and Ute Lemper's signature artist, Kurt Weill.

Most of the songs feature the Divine Comedy as Lemper's backing band. Neil Hannon and Joby Talbot also contributed two original songs and an arrangement of Brecht and Weill's "Tango Ballad", while Hannon sang two songs ("Tango Ballad", "Split") as duets with Lemper.

The French version of the album includes a bonus CD with three songs in French. Arthur H sings with Lemper on "Maison Close", the translation of "Tango Ballad". The Japanese version of the album includes an additional track: "Lullaby", written by Scott Walker.

Legacy
The album was included in the book 1001 Albums You Must Hear Before You Die.

Track listing

Chart positions

References

External links
 https://web.archive.org/web/20110707173325/http://www.ashortsite.com/discs/?page=collab_ute
 http://www.discogs.com/Ute-Lemper-Punishing-Kiss/release/1101544

2000 albums
Ute Lemper albums
Albums produced by Hal Willner
Decca Records albums
Avant-pop albums